Neil Briggs (born 1 June 1985 in Germany) is a rugby union player who most recently played for Sale Sharks.

Briggs plays as a Hooker, but he can also play as a Flanker.

Briggs started his career at Rotherham Titans before moving to Sale Sharks where he notched up 104 appearances from 2005 to 2011. In the 2005–2006 season, Briggs made 3 appearances as Sale Sharks won their first ever Premiership title. In October 2011 he left Sale to join French club Bourgoin for the remainder of the 2011–12 season before returning to the Aviva Premiership with London Welsh in 2012.

Briggs made his debut for the England Saxons against the Argentina Jaguars at the 2009 Churchill Cup.

After James Gaskell was injured in October 2010, Briggs was appointed Sale's captain for the remainder of the season. In turn, Briggs too succumbed to injury a month into his tenure as captain. The shoulder injury – which was sustained in a practise session when Briggs was tackled by Neil McMillan – sidelined him for up to three months.

For the 2013–14 season Briggs was signed by Leicester Tigers. On 30 January 2015, Briggs resigned with his old club Sale Sharks for the 2015–16 season onwards.

For the 2017-2018 Season Briggs signed for National 2 North side Sale FC Rugby.

References

External links
Sale Sharks profile
Leicester Tigers Profile
ESPN Profile

1985 births
English rugby union players
Living people
Rotherham Titans players
Rugby union hookers
Sale Sharks players
Leicester Tigers players